Santa Cruz, Pucaraju, Pukaraju (possibly from Quechua puka red, rahu snow, ice, mountain with snow) or Pico de Huaylas (Spanish for "peak of Huaylas") is a mountain in the Cordillera Blanca in the Andes of Peru; within Santa Cruz District, Huaylas Province, Ancash.

See also 
 Lake Atuncocha
 Caraz
 Taulliraju

References 

Mountains of Peru
Mountains of Ancash Region
Six-thousanders of the Andes